Atif Jabbar (born 15 June 1990) is a Pakistani cricketer. He was the leading wicket-taker for National Bank of Pakistan in the 2018–19 Quaid-e-Azam Trophy, with twenty-one dismissals in seven matches.

References

External links
 

1990 births
Living people
Pakistani cricketers
Lahore Whites cricketers
National Bank of Pakistan cricketers
United Bank Limited cricketers
Cricketers from Sheikhupura